This is a list of Sports Illustrated magazine's all-decade awards and honors for 2000–2009.

Top 20 Male Athletes of the Decade
Top 20 Male Athletes of the Decade were:
Tiger Woods (U.S.), golf
Roger Federer (Switzerland), tennis
Michael Phelps (U.S.), swimming
Lance Armstrong (U.S.), cycling
Usain Bolt (Jamaica), track and field
Tom Brady (U.S.), American football
Kobe Bryant (U.S.), basketball
Peyton Manning (U.S.), American football
Albert Pujols (U.S.), baseball
Michael Schumacher (Germany), auto racing
Mariano Rivera (Panama), baseball
Tim Duncan (U.S.), basketball
Zinedine Zidane (France),  football
Shaquille O'Neal (U.S.), basketball
Jimmie Johnson (U.S.), NASCAR
LeBron James (U.S.), basketball
Manny Pacquiao (Philippines), boxing
Derek Jeter (U.S.), baseball
Nicklas Lidström (Sweden), ice hockey
Alex Rodriguez (U.S.), baseball

Top 20 Female Athletes of the Decade

Top 20 Female Athletes of the Decade were:
Serena Williams (U.S.), tennis
Annika Sörenstam (Sweden), golf
Yelena Isinbayeva (Russia), pole vault
Justine Henin (Belgium), tennis
Lisa Leslie (U.S.), basketball
Venus Williams (U.S.), tennis
Marta (Brazil), football
Lorena Ochoa (Mexico), golf
Diana Taurasi (U.S.), basketball
Misty May-Treanor and Kerri Walsh (U.S.), beach volleyball
Candace Parker (U.S.), basketball
Paula Radcliffe (U.K.), marathon
Janica Kostelić (Croatia), alpine skiing
Carolina Klüft (Sweden), heptathlon
Sheryl Swoopes (U.S.), basketball
Hayley Wickenheiser (Canada), ice hockey
Cat Osterman (U.S.), softball
Cathy Freeman (Australia), track and field
Dara Torres (U.S.), swimming
Tirunesh Dibaba (Ethiopia), distance running

All-Decade Team (in eight sports)

MLB All-Decade Team

MLB All-Decade Team:

 
C – Joe Mauer, Twins
1B – Albert Pujols, Cardinals
2B – Chase Utley, Phillies
SS – Derek Jeter, Yankees
3B – Alex Rodriguez, Mariners–Rangers–Yankees
LF – Barry Bonds, Giants
CF – Carlos Beltrán, Royals–Astros–Mets
RF – Vladimir Guerrero, Expos–Angels
DH – David Ortiz, Twins–Red Sox
Pitchers:
Starting rotation – Pedro Martínez, Red Sox–Mets–Phillies; Johan Santana, Twins–Mets; Roy Halladay, Blue Jays; Randy Johnson, Diamondbacks–Yankees–Giants; Curt Schilling, Phillies–Diamondbacks–Red Sox
Setup man – Scot Shields, Angels
Closer – Mariano Rivera, Yankees
MANAGER – Joe Torre, Yankees–Dodgers

NBA All-Decade Team

NBA All-Decade Team: 

 
STARTING LINEUP
PG – Steve Nash, Mavericks–Suns
SG – Kobe Bryant, Lakers
SF – LeBron James, Cavaliers
PF – Tim Duncan, Spurs
C – Shaquille O'Neal, Lakers–Heat–Suns–Cavaliers
COACH – Phil Jackson, Lakers
GENERAL MANAGER – Gregg Popovich / R. C. Buford, Spurs

RESERVES
PF – Kevin Garnett, Timberwolves–Celtics
PG – Jason Kidd, Suns–Nets–Mavericks
SG – Dwyane Wade, Heat
PF – Dirk Nowitzki, Mavericks
SF – Paul Pierce, Celtics
SG – Allen Iverson, 76ers-Nuggets-Pistons-Grizzlies
SF – Carmelo Anthony, Nuggets

NFL All-Decade Team

NFL All-Decade Team: 

 
OFFENSE
WR – Randy Moss, Vikings–Raiders–Patriots
T – Walter Jones, Seahawks
G – Steve Hutchinson, Seahawks–Vikings
C – Kevin Mawae, Jets–Titans
G – Alan Faneca, Steelers–Jets
T – Jonathan Ogden, Ravens
TE – Tony Gonzalez, Chiefs–Falcons
WR – Hines Ward, Steelers
QB – Tom Brady, Patriots 
RB – LaDainian Tomlinson, Chargers
FB – Lorenzo Neal, Titans–Bengals–Chargers–Ravens
SPECIAL TEAMS
K – Adam Vinatieri, Patriots–Colts
P – Shane Lechler, Raiders
KR/PR – Dante Hall, Chiefs–Rams
COACH – Bill Belichick, Patriots

 
DEFENSE
DE – Aaron Smith, Steelers
DT – Kevin Williams, Vikings
DT/NT – Jamal Williams, Chargers
DE – Jason Taylor, Dolphins–Redskins
OLB – Mike Vrabel, Steelers–Patriots–Chiefs
ILB – Ray Lewis, Ravens
ILB – London Fletcher, Rams–Bills–Redskins
OLB – Derrick Brooks, Buccaneers
CB – Champ Bailey, Redskins-Broncos
CB – Antoine Winfield, Bills–Vikings
S – Ed Reed, Ravens
S – Brian Dawkins, Eagles–Broncos

NHL All-Decade Team

NHL All-Decade Team:

 
FIRST TEAM
G – Martin Brodeur, Devils
D – Nicklas Lidström, Red Wings
D – Scott Niedermayer, Devils–Ducks
LW – Alexander Ovechkin, Capitals
C – Sidney Crosby, Penguins
RW – Jaromír Jágr, Penguins–Capitals–Rangers  
COACH – Mike Babcock, Ducks–Red Wings

SECOND TEAM
G – Jean-Sébastien Giguère, Flames–Ducks
D – Chris Pronger, Blues–Oilers–Ducks–Flyers
D – Zdeno Chára, Islanders-Senators–Bruins
LW – Ilya Kovalchuk, Thrashers
C – Joe Sakic, Avalanche
RW – Jarome Iginla, Flames
COACH – Lindy Ruff, Sabres

College basketball All-Decade Team

College basketball All-Decade Team:

FIRST TEAM
SF – Shane Battier, Duke
PF – Tyler Hansbrough, North Carolina
C – Emeka Okafor, Connecticut
SG – JJ Redick, Duke
PG – Jason Williams, Duke
COACH – Roy Williams, North Carolina

SECOND TEAM
SF – Carmelo Anthony, Syracuse
SF – Adam Morrison, Gonzaga
SF – Kevin Durant, Texas
SG – Juan Dixon, Maryland
PG – Jameer Nelson, Saint Joseph's

College football All-Decade Team

College football All-Decade Team:

OFFENSE
WR – Larry Fitzgerald, Pittsburgh
T – Ryan Clady, Boise State
G – Steve Hutchinson, Michigan
C – Greg Eslinger, Minnesota
G – Duke Robinson, Oklahoma
T – Jake Long, Michigan
TE – Kellen Winslow II, Miami
WR – Michael Crabtree, Texas Tech
QB – Tim Tebow, Florida
RB – Darren McFadden, Arkansas
RB – Adrian Peterson, Oklahoma
SPECIAL TEAMS
K – Mike Nugent, Ohio State
P – Daniel Sepulveda, Baylor
KR – Felix Jones, Arkansas
PR – Wes Welker, Texas Tech
COACH – Urban Meyer, Florida

DEFENSE
DE – David Pollack, Georgia
DT – Tommie Harris, Oklahoma
DT – Ndamukong Suh, Nebraska
DE – Terrell Suggs, Arizona State
LB – A. J. Hawk, Ohio State
LB – Derrick Johnson, Texas
LB – Patrick Willis, Mississippi
CB – Antoine Cason, Arizona
CB – Derrick Strait, Oklahoma
S – Eric Berry, Tennessee
S – Ed Reed, Miami

Soccer All-Decade Team

Soccer All-Decade Team:

 
G – Gianluigi Buffon, Parma-Juventus
D – Cafu, AS Roma-AC Milan
D – Fabio Cannavaro, Parma-Inter Milan-Juventus-Real Madrid
D – Paolo Maldini, AC Milan
D – Roberto Carlos, Real Madrid-Fenerbahçe
M – Cristiano Ronaldo, Sporting-Manchester United-Real Madrid
M – Zinedine Zidane, Juventus-Real Madrid
M – Patrick Vieira, Arsenal-Juventus-Inter Milan
M – Lionel Messi, FC Barcelona
M – Ronaldinho, Grêmio-Paris Saint Germain-FC Barcelona-AC Milan
F – Ronaldo, Inter Milan-Real Madrid-AC Milan-Corinthians
MANAGER – Guus Hiddink, Real Betis-South Korea-PSV Eindhoven-Australia-Russia-Chelsea

Golf All-Decade Team

Golf All-Decade Team:

Tiger Woods
Phil Mickelson
Annika Sorenstam
Vijay Singh
Hale Irwin
Lorena Ochoa
Ryan Moore
Dana Quigley
Pádraig Harrington
Tom Watson

Top 10 Coaches/Managers of the Decade

Top 10 Coaches/Managers of the Decade: 
Phil Jackson, Los Angeles Lakers (NBA)
Bill Belichick, New England Patriots (NFL)
Joe Torre, New York Yankees–Los Angeles Dodgers (MLB)
Terry Francona, Boston Red Sox (MLB)
Tony Dungy, Tampa Bay Buccaneers-Indianapolis Colts (NFL)
Gregg Popovich, San Antonio Spurs (NBA)
Geno Auriemma, University of Connecticut women's basketball
Roy Williams, University of North Carolina men's basketball
Urban Meyer, Bowling Green football – Utah football – Florida football
Tom Izzo, Michigan State men's basketball

Top 10 GMs/Executives of the Decade

Top 10 GMs/Executives of the Decade:
Scott Pioli, New England Patriots (NFL)
Ken Holland, Detroit Red Wings (NHL)
Theo Epstein, Boston Red Sox (MLB)
Kevin Colbert, Pittsburgh Steelers (NFL)
R. C. Buford, San Antonio Spurs (NBA)
Rick Hendrick, Hendrick Motorsports (NASCAR)
Pat Gillick, Toronto Blue Jays/Seattle Mariners/Philadelphia Phillies (MLB)
Jeremy Foley, University of Florida (NCAA)
Joe Dumars, Detroit Pistons (NBA)
Billy Beane, Oakland Athletics (MLB)

Top Team of the Decade (in six sports)
Top Team of the Decade:

MLB

New York Yankees,

NBA

Los Angeles Lakers, 2000–01

NFL

New England Patriots, 2007

NHL

Detroit Red Wings, 2001–02

College basketball

Florida Gators men's basketball, 2006–07

College football

Miami Hurricanes football, 2001

Top 25 Franchises of the Decade
Top 25 Franchises of the Decade including professional and college teams.

Los Angeles Lakers (NBA)
New England Patriots (NFL)
Connecticut Huskies women's basketball
San Antonio Spurs (NBA)
New York Yankees (MLB)
Detroit Red Wings (NHL)
USC Trojans football
Indianapolis Colts (NFL)
Texas Longhorns football
North Carolina Tar Heels men's basketball
Boston Red Sox (MLB)
Oklahoma Sooners football
Kansas Jayhawks men's basketball

14. Pittsburgh Steelers (NFL)
15. Florida Gators football
16. LSU Tigers football
17. Michigan State Spartans men's basketball
18. Detroit Pistons (NBA)
19. New Jersey Devils (NHL)
20. Florida Gators men's basketball
21. Ohio State Buckeyes football
22. Duke Blue Devils men's basketball
23. St. Louis Cardinals (MLB)
24. Tennessee Lady Volunteers basketball
25. Los Angeles Angels of Anaheim (MLB)

Major League Baseball

Major League Baseball:
Player of the Decade: Albert Pujols, Cardinals
MLB All-Decade Team (above)
Best Manager: Joe Torre, Yankees and Dodgers
Best GM: Theo Epstein, Red Sox
Top Team of the Decade (above)
Best Franchise: New York Yankees
Best Regular-Season Game: Twins-Tigers, Oct. 6, 2009
Best Postseason Game: Yankees-Diamondbacks, Game 7, 2001 World Series

National Basketball Association

National Basketball Association:
Player of the Decade: Tim Duncan, Spurs
NBA All-Decade Team (above)
Best Coach: Phil Jackson, Lakers
Best GM: Gregg Popovich/R. C. Buford, Spurs
Top Team of the Decade (above)
Best Franchise: Los Angeles Lakers
Best Regular-Season Game: Suns-Nets; Dec. 7, 2006
Best Postseason Game: Lakers-Kings, Game 7, 2002 Western Conference finals

National Football League
National Football League:
Player of the Decade: Peyton Manning, Colts
NFL All-Decade Team (above)
Best Coach: Bill Belichick, Patriots
Best GM: Bill Polian, Colts
Top Team of the Decade (above)
Best Franchise: New England Patriots
Best Regular-Season Game: Colts 38, Buccaneers 35 (OT); Oct. 6, 2003
Best Playoff Game (non-Super Bowl): Steelers 21, Colts 18; 2005 AFC divisional game
Best Super Bowl: Steelers 27, Cardinals 23; XLIII

National Hockey League

National Hockey League:
Player of the Decade: Nicklas Lidström, Red Wings
NHL All-Decade Team (above)
Best Coach: Mike Babcock, Ducks and Red Wings
Best GM: Ken Holland, Red Wings
Top Team of the Decade (above)
Best Franchise: Detroit Red Wings
Most Dramatic Regular-Season Games: Maple Leafs-Canadiens; April 7, 2007; Islanders-Devils; April 8, 2007
Best Postseason Game: Flyers-Penguins; May 4–5, 2000

Soccer
Soccer: 
Player of the Decade: Zinedine Zidane, Juventus-Real Madrid
Best Manager: Guus Hiddink, Real Betis-South Korea-PSV Eindhoven-Australia-Russia-Chelsea
Best World Cup Game: United States vs. Portugal, in 2002
Best Non-World Cup Game: AC Milan vs. Liverpool, in 2005
Best National Team: Brazil
Best Club Team: Manchester United F.C.
Cinderella: South Korea at the 2002 FIFA World Cup
Biggest Overachiever: Greece at the 2004 UEFA European Championship
Biggest Underachiever: Argentina
Biggest Controversy: 2006 Italian football scandal
Hottest Feud: Landon Donovan-David Beckham
Signature Play: Zidane's pirouette
Under-the-Radar Story: MLS players' lawsuit
Biggest Meltdown: Zinedine Zidane
Best Trash Talker: Marco Materazzi
Most Inspirational Story: U.S. women's team, in 2008
Biggest Villain: Cuauhtémoc Blanco
Pyrrhic Victory: France vs. Ireland, in 2009
Best Club Rivalry: Arsenal F.C.–Manchester United F.C. rivalry
Best National-Team Rivalry: France–Italy football rivalry
Outsized Personality: José Mourinho
Best Innovation: High-definition football broadcasts
Worst Innovation: Tinkering with the ball
Biggest Near-Miss: Torsten Frings' uncalled penalty, in 2002

Golf
Golf:
Golfer of the Decade: Tiger Woods

College basketball honors
College basketball:
Player of the Decade: Tyler Hansbrough, North Carolina
All-Decade Team (above)
Best Coach: Roy Williams, North Carolina
Top Team of the Decade (above)
Best School: Michigan State
Best Single-Season Team: Saint Joseph's, 2004
Best Regular-Season Game: Gonzaga 109, Michigan State 103 (3 OT) in the 2005 Maui Invitational
Best Postseason Game: Syracuse 127, Connecticut 117 (6 OT) in the 2009 Big East tournament
Best Year for NCAA Tournament: 2005
Best Recruiting Class: Florida, 2004
Signature Play: Mario Chalmers' game-tying shot for Kansas at the end of regulation in the 2008 NCAA tournament final against Memphis
 Biggest Controversy: Baylor University basketball scandal, 2003
 Biggest Cinderella: George Mason, 2006

College football honors
College football:
Player of the Decade: Tim Tebow, Florida
All-Decade Team (above)
Best Coach: Urban Meyer, Bowling Green/Utah/Florida
Top Team of the Decade (above)
Best Program: USC
Best Regular-Season Game: USC at Notre Dame (2005)
Best Bowl Game: 2007 Fiesta Bowl (Boise State vs. Oklahoma)
Biggest Upset: Appalachian State 34, Michigan 32 (2007)
Signature Play: Tim Tebow's jump pass
Biggest Controversy:
Most Outstanding Single-Game Performance: Vince Young, for Texas against USC (2006 Rose Bowl)
Best Recruiting Class: USC, 2003
Best Team Rivalry: Oklahoma–Texas
Best Coaching Rivalry: Kyle Whittingham (Utah) vs. Bronco Mendenhall (BYU)
Best Conference: SEC
Best Innovation: Spread option

Top 24 one-hit wonders of the decade
Top 24 one-hit wonders: 
 David Tyree (NFL) (see also Helmet Catch)
 George Mason Patriots men's basketball (2006)
 Hasim Rahman (boxing)
 Tampa Bay Lightning (NHL)
 Maurice Clarett (NCAA football)
 Greece national football team (UEFA Euro 2004)
 Hilary Lunke (golf)
 Aaron Small (MLB)
 Giacomo (horse) 
 Golden State Warriors (NBA)
 Derek Anderson (NFL)
 Gastón Gaudio and Anastasia Myskina (tennis)
 Michael Waltrip (NASCAR)
 Florida Marlins (MLB) (2003)
 José Théodore (NHL)
 Los Angeles Clippers (NBA)
 Jonathan Cheechoo (NHL)
 Bud Smith (MLB)
 Playmakers
 Bob May (golf)
 Senegal national football team 
 Jerome James (NBA)
 Edmonton Oilers (NHL)

Top 24 blockbuster trades of the decade
Top 24 blockbuster trades:

Top 10 new stadiums of the decade

Top 10 new stadiums: 
 Busch Stadium (St. Louis Cardinals) 
 CenturyLink Field (Seattle Seahawks) 
 Miller Park (Milwaukee Brewers) 
 Citizens Bank Park (Philadelphia Phillies) 
 NRG Stadium (Houston Texans) 
 PNC Park (Pittsburgh Pirates) 
 Yankee Stadium (New York Yankees) 
 AT&T Stadium (Dallas Cowboys) 
 AT&T Park (San Francisco Giants) 
 University of Phoenix Stadium (Arizona Cardinals)

Top 21 milestones of the decade

Top 21 milestones: 
 Lance Armstrong's seven Tour de France titles 
 Michael Phelps winning eight gold medals at the 2008 Summer Olympics 
 Barry Bonds hitting 756 home runs 
 Roger Federer winning 14 majors 
 Emmitt Smith breaking the all-time NFL rushing record 
 Tiger Woods winning all four golfing majors in a single 12-month period 
 Jimmie Johnson winning five consecutive NASCAR championships 
 Florida Gators men's basketball winning consecutive NCAA championships 
 Tiger Woods winning the 2000 U.S. Open by a 15-stroke margin 
 2007 New England Patriots' 18-0 record 
 Martin Brodeur winning 552 games 
 Brett Favre throwing 421 touchdowns 
 Usain Bolt breaking the 100 meter and 200 meter dash world records 
 Kelly Slater winning 34 surfing events, receiving a perfect score and nine ASP championships 
 Ronaldo scoring 15 World Cup goals 
 Ichiro Suzuki breaking the single-season hit record 
 Pat Summitt becoming the most victorious basketball coach in NCAA history 
 Bob Knight winning his 880th game 
 Tom Brady breaking the single-season passing touchdown record 
 John Gagliardi breaking the record for NCAA football wins

Top 21 rivalries of the decade
Top 21 rivalries:
 New York Yankees vs. Boston Red Sox (baseball)
 Roger Federer vs. Rafael Nadal (tennis)
 New England Patriots vs. Indianapolis Colts (American football)
 Shaquille O'Neal vs. Kobe Bryant (basketball)
 North Carolina Tar Heels vs. Duke Blue Devils (college basketball) 
 Oklahoma Sooners vs. Texas Longhorns (college football) 
 Sidney Crosby vs. Alexander Ovechkin (hockey)
 Manchester United vs. Arsenal (football)
 Tennessee Lady Volunteers vs. Connecticut Huskies (women's college basketball)
 Tiger Woods vs. Phil Mickelson (golf)
 Micky Ward vs. Arturo Gatti (boxing)
 Tony Stewart vs. Kurt Busch (NASCAR)
 Pittsburgh Steelers vs. Baltimore Ravens (American football)
 JJ Redick vs. Adam Morrison (college basketball)
 Ken Shamrock vs. Tito Ortiz (UFC)
 France vs. Italy (soccer)
 Los Angeles Lakers vs. San Antonio Spurs (basketball)
 Pittsburgh Penguins vs. Philadelphia Flyers (hockey)
 Moneyball vs. Tradition (baseball)
 United States vs. Canada (women's ice hockey)

Ten "overlooked" performances
Ten "overlooked" performances:

Ten memorable acts of sportsmanship
Ten memorable acts of sportsmanship:

Top 10 stories of the decade
Top 10 stories of the decade:

Top 10 flops of the decade
Top 10 flops:
 Duke Blue Devils men's basketball — Unlike the other entries in this list, Duke was highly successful on the court throughout the decade. The Blue Devils were "honored" because of their alleged tendency to flop in order to draw offensive fouls.
 2004 USA men's basketball team — Amid a breakdown of team chemistry, Team USA lost more games in the 2004 Olympics (three) than it had in all previous Olympic tournaments combined (two).
 Barry Zito — After considerable success with the Oakland Athletics, the left-handed pitcher crossed San Francisco Bay after the 2006 season to play for the San Francisco Giants, signing what was then the richest contract for a pitcher in baseball history. He proceeded to go 31–43 in the next three seasons, never posting an ERA below 4.00.
 Monday Night Football announcers, mainly Dennis Miller and Tony Kornheiser
 Charlie Weis at Notre Dame — A successful assistant coach in the NFL, Weis was 35–27 in 5 seasons at Notre Dame, including a record of 16–21 in his last 3 seasons.
 Darko Miličić — Drafted #2 overall in the 2003 NBA draft by the Detroit Pistons, immediately before Carmelo Anthony, Chris Bosh and Dwyane Wade, but never averaged more than 8 points in any season.
 Steve Spurrier with the Washington Redskins — A successful coach in the NCAA, Spurrier was 12-20 in his 2 years with the Redskins, and did not make the playoffs in those years.
 Ron Zook, first at Florida and then at Illinois — Zook coached Florida for 3 seasons, with a record of 23–14, and did not beat a ranked opponent at home in those years. He was then hired by Illinois and compiled a record of 34–51 in his 7 seasons there.
 Matt Millen — In Millen's seven-plus seasons as the general manager of the Detroit Lions, the team went 31–84. He was fired three games into the 2008 season, which would end with the Lions becoming the first NFL team ever to go 0–16.
 NFL Network — At the end of 2009, after six years of operation, the NFL's in-house TV network still had not reached carriage deals with many of the nation's biggest cable providers.

Top 10 scandals of the decade
Top 10 scandals:
 BALCO doping scandal (2003) – see also Barry Bonds perjury case and Marion Jones
 Mitchell Report (2007) and leaked 2003 MLB list of PED users (2009)
 Michael Vick dogfighting case (2007)
 Duke lacrosse case (2006)
 Tim Donaghy NBA betting scandal (2007)
 Tiger Woods sex scandal (2009)
 Danny Almonte age fraud (2001 Little League World Series)
 Tour de France doping scandals, 2006 and 2007
 Baylor University basketball scandal (2003)
 Spygate (2007)

See also
 List of sports awards honoring women
 Sports Illustrated Sportsman of the Year

Notes
 For ESPN.com's list of the ten greatest teams of the 20th century (in the U.S.), see footnote.

Footnotes

2009
American sports trophies and awards
Top sports lists
2000s in sports
2000s in the United States
Awards established in 2009
2009-related lists
Sports awards honoring women